Craugastor amniscola is a species of frogs in the family Craugastoridae. It is found in western Guatemala and in Chiapas, Mexico. The specific name amniscola is derived from Latin amnis for rivulet and -cola for dweller and refers to the habitat of this species. Accordingly, common name rivulet rainfrog has been coined for it.

Description
Adult males can reach at least  and adult females at least  in snout–vent length. The snout is subacuminate in dorsal view and round in lateral view. Males have a few scattered, large, flat or rounded tubercles in their upper eyelids. The tympanum is distinct. The finger and toe discs are weakly developed. The fingers have weak lateral keels while the toes have lateral flanges and moderate webbing. The upper parts are medium to olive brown, with heavy black mottling on the back. The limbs have moderately distinct crossbars. The flanks and the groin are whitish with irregular brown or black mottling. The venter is whitish or cream.

Habitat and conservation
Development is direct, i.e., there is no free-living larval stage.

This species is threatened by habitat loss and water pollution. Chytridiomycosis is a potential threat.

References

amniscola
Amphibians of Guatemala
Amphibians of Mexico
Taxa named by Jonathan A. Campbell
Taxa named by Jay M. Savage
Amphibians described in 2000
Taxonomy articles created by Polbot